The Houston Power is a women's football which started in 2010. They are a member of the Women's Football Alliance .  Based in Houston, Texas, the Power play their home games at Pioneer Stadium on the campus of Lutheran Academy South in Houston, Texas.

Season-By-Season

|-
|2010 || 5 || 4 || 0 || 3rd American Southwest || --
|-
|2011 || 6 || 2 || 0 || 1st American Gulf || Lost American Conference Quarterfinal (Dallas)
|-
|2012* || 4 || 4 || 0 || 3rd WFA American 12 || --
|-
|2013 || 1|| 7 || 0 || 4th American Conference Division 9 || --
|-
|2014 || 5 || 3 || 0 || 2nd American South Central || Won First Round (Stampede) Lost American Conference Quarterfinal (Titans)
|-
|2015 || 5 || 3 || 0 || 3rd American Southwest || --
|-
|2016 || 1 || 6 || 0 || 4th WFA II American Southwest || Lost First Round (Slam)
|-
|2017 || 2 || 6 || 0 || 3rd WFA III American Southwest || --
|-
|2018 || 2 || 6 || 0|| 3rd WFA III American Southwest || Lost First Round (Outlaws)
|-
|2019 || 3 || 5 || 0 || 3rd WFA III American Midwest || --
|-
|2020 || colspan="6" rowspan="1" align="center" | Season cancelled due to COVID-19 pandemic
|-
|2021 || 4 || 2 || 0 || 3rd WFA III American Midwest || --
|-
|2022 || 2 || 3 || 0 || 3rd WFA III Midwest ||--
|-
|Totals || 40 || 51 || 0
|colspan="2"| (including playoffs) (1-4)

* = Current standing

2010

Season schedule

2011

Standings

Season schedule

** = Won by forfeit

2012

Season schedule

External links
 Houston Power official website

Women's Football Alliance teams
American football teams in Houston
American football teams established in 2010
2010 establishments in Texas
Women's sports in Texas